Summer Madness is Ireland's largest Christian festival. It usually takes place over the first weekend in July at the Glenarm Castle, Ballymena.

Origins
The festival was commissioned thirty years ago by the Church of Ireland Youth Department. The first iteration of the festival was held at Castle Archdale, Lisnarick, County Fermanagh, then in Gosford Forest Park, County Armagh. Due to the foot-and-mouth crisis in 2001, the festival relocated to the King's Hall, where it remained until 2011. It has since moved to the Glenarm Castle for the 2012 festival.

Target audience
The festival is aimed at young people, and consistently targets those aged 15–25, and also caters for ages 5–11. The festival expects at least 1,700 people camping on site for the duration.

Amenities and facilities
 Seminars 
 Debates 
 Arts Workshops 
 Sports and activities programme 
 Internet cafe
 Cinema
 Exhibition hall
 Christian rock groups  
 Worship meetings which are the focal point of the festival are held twice-daily

In 2008, a similar programme under the banner of 'Urban Soul' began in Dublin. In January 2008, Summer Madness started in Australia.

References

External links
Summer Madness official website

Christianity in Northern Ireland
Church of Ireland